Jenny Wolpert née Ryman (born mid-1980s) is a Swedish American professional bridge player and teacher. Before emigrating to North America she played as Jenny Ryman (to 2007). Wolpert is a world champion, having been a member of the USA2 team that won the Venice Cup in 2013.

Jenny Ryman was born in Sweden. She played for the Sweden women in two world championship tournaments, the 2004 World Team Olympiad and the 2005 Venice Cup. In the European Bridge League championships she played for Sweden teams from 2002 (Schools, or under-21) to 2006 (Women).

She is married to Gavin Wolpert, also a professional bridge player. They have three children and live primarily in Palm Beach Gardens, Florida.

Bridge accomplishments

Wins

 Venice Cup (1) 2013 
 North American Bridge Championships (6)
Edgar Kaplan Blue Ribbon Pairs (1) 2005  
Machlin Women's Swiss Teams (1) 2011 
Wagar Women's Knockout Teams (2) 2011, 2012 
Sternberg Women's Board-a-Match Teams (2) 2009, 2010 
Chicago Mixed Board-a-Match (1) 2009

Runners-up

 North American Bridge Championships
 Mitchell Board-a-Match Teams (1) 2013

References

External links
 Bridge Winners profile (maintained by Wolpert)
  (Jenny Ryman to 2007)
 Interview with Jenny Ryman Wolpert short text interview at Youth 4 Bridge (conducted 2009)
 Bridge Kids: Jenny Wolpert audio-video conversation at YouTube (uploaded August 5, 2010)
 Introducing: Jenny Ryman Wolpert audio-video interview at YouTube by Audrey Grant (July 29, 2014)
  (Mari Ryman)

1980s births
American contract bridge players
Swedish contract bridge players
Venice Cup players
Swedish emigrants to the United States
Living people
Year of birth missing (living people)
Place of birth missing (living people)